Madeleine Boyd (born 20 March 1993) is an Australian rules footballer who played for  in the AFL Women's (AFLW). She played every match in her debut season to finish with seven games.

After one season with Melbourne, Boyd was traded to  during the 2017 trade period.

In May 2018 Boyd accepted an offer from expansion club  to play with the club in the 2019 AFLW season, becoming the first player to play for three AFLW clubs. She kicked Geelong's first ever goal in their inaugural game.She was delisted by Geelong at the conclusion of the 2021 AFL Women's season.

Boyd is currently studying a Bachelor of Exercise Sport Science at Deakin University.

References

External links 

1993 births
Living people
Greater Western Sydney Giants (AFLW) players
Melbourne Football Club (AFLW) players
Australian rules footballers from Victoria (Australia)
Geelong Football Club (AFLW) players